Adam de Vos (born 21 October 1993) is a Canadian cyclist, who currently rides for UCI ProTeam .

Major results

2013
 7th Road race, Jeux de la Francophonie
2015
 Pan American Road Championships
5th Road race
7th Under-23 time trial
 7th Overall Tour of the Gila
 9th Road race, UCI Under-23 Road World Championships
2017
 1st Raiffeisen Grand Prix
 2nd Overall Joe Martin Stage Race
1st Stage 1 (ITT)
 7th Overall Tour of the Gila
2018
 1st White Spot / Delta Road Race
 1st Stage 3 Tour de Langkawi
2019
 1st  Road race, National Road Championships
 4th Classic Loire Atlantique
 9th Slag om Norg
2020
 10th Overall Vuelta a Murcia

References

External links

Canadian male cyclists
Canadian people of Dutch descent
Cyclists from British Columbia
Sportspeople from Victoria, British Columbia
1993 births
Living people